is a Japanese voice actress and singer who works for I'm Enterprise. She won the Best Rookie Actress Award at the 8th Seiyu Awards. She is best known for her roles such as Rikka Takanashi in Love, Chunibyo & Other Delusions, Norman in The Promised Neverland, Sharo Kirima in Is the Order a Rabbit?, Lililuka Arde in Is It Wrong to Try to Pick Up Girls in a Dungeon?, Hiyori Iki in Noragami, Catarina Claes in My Next Life as a Villainess: All Routes Lead to Doom! and Angel Devil in Chainsaw Man.

She debuted as a singer in 2014 under Pony Canyon with the song "Soushou Innocence". Her best-selling single is youthful beautiful. With her rising success, she also participated in many music festivals and held one-man lives in large venues such as Yoyogi National Gymnasium two days with 13,291 capacity and Nippon Budokan with 14,471 capacity.

As an actress, she debuted in Unofficial Sentai Akibaranger with the role of Hakase Hiroyo. She is the older sister of Yuma Uchida.

Personal life and biography
When she was in elementary school, she had a strong interest in gaming. At the time she entered middle school, she joined the Theater Club and later on realized that she wanted to voice game characters and she soon then discovered the profession of being a voice actor. In the autumn of her third year in high school, she decided to become a voice actress. Afterwards, she went on the internet and read magazines to decide on which university for voice acting she was going to enter and later on decided to join the Japan Narration Acting Institute (日本ナレーション演技研究所 Nihon Narēshon Engi Kenkyūjo).

Uchida completed her studies in narration school during 2009. Upon graduation, she made her debut as a voice actress in the OVA Boku, Otari-man as an office employee. In April 2010, she signed to voice talent agency I'm Enterprise.

As a voice actress, she admires veteran voice actress, Kikuko Inoue, and is close friends with fellow voice actress and singer, Sumire Uesaka. She is a fan of the baseball team, Fukuoka SoftBank Hawks. Her nicknames include "Mayayan" and "Mareitaso".

In 2011, she made her first appearance in a video game in the game Gal Gun with the role Kaoruko Sakurazaki. In 2012, she starred for the first time in the anime Sankarea with the role Rea Sanka. In the same year, she debuted as an actress in Unofficial Sentai Akibaranger with the role of Hakase Hiroyo.

Among the works in she appeared, she mentions that the work she especially has strong feelings for is Love, Chunibyo & Other Delusions (as Rikka Takanashi); and the works that were a big challenge in her voice actress career are Charlotte (as Yusa/Misa Nishimori) and Kabaneri of the Iron Fortress (as Ayame). Since the early years in her career, she always hoped to voice a male character and her wish was finally realized in The Promised Neverland as Norman.

In 2014, Uchida debuted as a singer with the single Soushou Innocence, under the label Pony Canyon. Same year, she won the Best Rookie Actress Award at the 8th Seiyu Awards. Her first photobook  was also released on December 24, 2014.

In 2015, she participated in Animelo Summer Live for the first time. She has continued to participate every year since then, except 2020 (which was canceled).

On December 24, 2017; she announced the opening of her official fan club "LIFE IS LIKE A SUNNY DAY" at Maaya Happy Birthday & Xmas Party!! 2017.

Her second photobook étoile was released on March 25, 2019.

On February 7, 2020, she appeared in the live action movie Wotakoi: Love Is Hard for Otaku with the role of herself. In the same year, she made a guest appearance in a detective drama for the first time in the sixth episode of Keishichou Sousa Ichikachou 2020 with the role Rika Oita.

On May 8, 2022, her agency announced that Uchida had tested positive for COVID-19. She returned to work on May 17, 2022.

Since 2021, her low-voiced roles in many foreign dubs (such as Shang-Chi and the Legend of the Ten Rings (as Xialing, 2021), Dune (as Chani, 2021), Top Gun: Maverick (as Phoenix, 2022)) and many popular anime (such as The Promised Neverland (as Norman, 2019-2021), Bocchi the Rock! (as Seika Ijichi, 2022), Chainsaw Man (as Angel Devil, 2022), The Most Heretical Last Boss Queen (as Stale Royal Ivy, 2023)) are steadily increasing, shocking people for the gap with her 'usual' voice. She's rapidly gaining recognition for her wide vocal range.

On December 23, 2022, Uchida participated in the popular Japanese music television program Music Station. She performed a collab with Kouki Maeda and Cocomi for the Aladdin theme song A Whole New World.

Uchida released her first photobook (フォトブック) Maaya Doki (まあやドキ) on February 8, 2023. The photobook peaked at 1st place on the Oricon Weekly Photobooks Chart. To commemorate the release, Uchida was in charge of the cover and opening gravure of Weekly Young Jump No. 11 released on February 9.

Musical career 
Uchida made her solo debut in April 2014 under Pony Canyon with her first solo single, "Soushou Innocence" (創傷イノセンス); it peaked at 14th place on the Oricon Weekly Singles Chart and stayed on the chart for 9 weeks. The main song in the single was used as the opening theme song for the anime, Riddle Story of Devil. She released her second single, "Gimme! Revolution" (ギミー!レボリューション) on November 3, 2014; it peaked at 12th place on the Oricon Weekly Single Chart and stayed on the chart for 12 weeks. The titular song from the single was used as the opening theme song for the anime, Gonna be the Twin-Tail!!.

She released her 3rd single, "Karappo Capsule" (からっぽカプセル) on April 1, 2015. The song "Karappo Capsule" from the single was used as the ending theme song for the anime, Comical Psychosomatic Medicine. Her first solo album titled "PENKI" was released on December 2, 2015; it peaked at 6th place on the Oricon Weekly Albums Chart and stayed on the chart for 7 weeks. On February 28, 2016, Uchida held her 1st solo live concert titled "1st LIVE Hello, 1st Contact!" in Nakano Sun Plaza. Her 4th single, "Resonant Heart", was released on May 11, 2016. The titular song in the single was used as the opening theme song for the anime, Seisen Cerberus.

She released her 1st mini album named "Drive-in Theater" on January 11, 2017; the mini album peaked at 6th place on the Oricon Weekly Albums Chart and stayed on the chart for 5 weeks. The album was created with the desire to express her real self. Especially the song Smiling Spiral from the album was made with the purpose of "a cheering song". The album heavily features her hobbies; like Crossfire, a song like a festival song with baseball-like lyrics, Moratorium Dance Floor, which has a Japanese taste and Shiny drive, Moony dive, which is themed on driving. On February 25–26, 2017, she held her 2nd solo live concert in two days, titled "2nd LIVE Smiling Spiral" in Yoyogi National First Gymnasium with over 13,000 capacity. Her 5th single, "+INTERSECT+" was released on June 21, 2017. Her 6th single, "c.o.s.m.o.s" was released on October 25, 2017; it peaked at 6th place on the Oricon Weekly Singles Chart and stayed on the chart for 4 weeks. She held another solo live concert on July 1 and 29, 2017 in Tokyo and Osaka named, "Live 2017 +INTERSECT SUMMER+".

Her 7th single, "aventure bleu" was released on February 14, 2018. The titular song from the single was used as the opening theme song for the anime, Takunomi. Her 2nd album named "Magic Hour" was released on April 25, 2018; it peaked at 7th place on the Oricon Weekly Album Chart and stayed on the chart for 6 weeks. She opened her fanclub in April 2018; named "LIFE IS LIKE A SUNNY DAY". On June 17, 24 and July 1, 2018, she held her first solo live tour titled, "Magic Number TOUR 2018", in Fukuoka, Osaka, and Tokyo. Her 8th and best-selling single, "youthful beautiful", was released on October 17, 2018; it peaked at 7th place on the Oricon Weekly Singles Chart and stayed on the chart for 14 weeks. The titular song from the single was used as the ending theme song for the anime, SSSS.Gridman.

She held her live with the largest capacity (14,471), titled "New Year LIVE 2019 take you take me BUDOKAN!!" on January 1, 2019, in Nippon Budokan. She is the 8th artist to ever hold a solo live on January 1 in Nippon Budokan. She released her 9th single, "Kodou Escalation" (鼓動エスカレーション) on July 10, 2019. The titular song from the single was used as the second ending theme song for the anime, Ace of Diamond Act II. She released her 2nd mini album on October 2, 2019, named "you are here". The album peaked at 9th place on Oricon Weekly Singles Chart and stayed on the chart for 4 weeks. A live tour titled "Zepp Tour 2019 we are here" was held throughout Japan in selected Zepp locations in November and December 2019.

Her 10th single titled "No Scenario" (ノーシナリオ) was released on March 18, 2020. A live titled "LIVE 2020 Live For All Stars" was supposed to be held on July 5, 2020, in Yokohama Arena, but was canceled. Instead, an online live called "Hello, ONLINE contact!" was held on the same day, in Harevutai. Her 11th and double A-side single titled "Heartbeat City/Itsuka Kumo ga Haretanara" (ハートビートシティ／いつか雲が晴れたなら) was released on November 25, 2020.

She released her 12th single "Strobe Memory" (ストロボメモリー) on May 12, 2021. The titular song from the single was used as the ending theme song for the anime, SSSS.Dynazenon. The single peaked at 10th place on Oricon Weekly Singles Chart and stayed on the chart for 8 weeks. She held a live with audience after 1 and a half years titled "LIVE 2021 FLASH FLASH FLASH" on July 3, 2021, in Tachikawa Stage Garden. Her official YouTube channel was opened on September 3, 2021. Her 3rd album, "HIKARI" was released on October 27, 2021.

On February 20 and March 13 2022, she held a live tour called "LIVE 2022 MA-YA-YAN Happy Cream MAX!!", in Pacifico Yokohama and Grand Cube Osaka. In the Yokohama performance, it was announced that a revival of her 1st live called "Hello, 1st Contact [Revival]" would be held on September 24, 2022, in Culttz Kawasaki. Her 13th single "Kikoeru?" (聴こえる？) was released on April 20, 2022. The titular song from the single was used as the ending theme song for the anime, Miss Shachiku and the Little Baby Ghost. On September 16 2022, her 1st digital single "CHASER GAME" was released. The titular song from the single was used as the opening theme for the television drama of the same name.

Her 14th single "Loud Hailer" (ラウドヘイラー) was released on January 25, 2023. The titular song from the single was used as the ending theme song for the anime, The Iceblade Sorcerer Shall Rule the World. Starting from September 3, 2023 to October 15, 2023, she will hold a nationwide tour named "UCHIDA MAAYA Live Tour 2023", in six Zepp locations and SENDAI GIGS.

Filmography

Television animation

Film animation

Original video animation (OVA)

Original net animation (ONA)

Video games

Drama CD

Dubbing roles 
Live-action movie

Live-action drama

Animation

Commercials 

 Unofficial Sentai Akibaranger「MMZ-01 Moe Moe Zukyun」 (2012)
 Chain Chronicle (2014)
 Millennium War Aigis (2015), Anna
 Meiji「SABAS Milk Grapefruit Flavor」(2015)
 Mitsubishi Jisho Residence (2017)
 Marui no Anime「Neko ga Kureta Maarui no Shiawase」 (2017)
 KADOKAWA「Ikinokori Renkinjutsushi wa Machi de Shizuka ni Kurashitai」#1 (2017)
 Pelack T Tablets (2018)
 Dydo BLEND COFFEE (2018), Kouko Sukita
 Parapara Manga「Midjikana Mono Ni AGC／o Furo Hen」Female ver. (2018)
 SoftBank Giga Kuni Monogatari (2019), Satowa (voice)
 Mon Petit Natural Gourmand Campaign (2019), Cat
 Paiza Learning (2019), Mikage Suzutsuki
 Baby Star Ramen Otsumami (2019)
 Harry Potter: Wizards Unite (2019), Girl Protagonist (Japanese voice)
 HABA Hitoshizu-kun (2020)
 Audio Technica ATH-ANC300TW（Wireless Earphones) (2020)
 Ichijinsha「My Next Life as a Villainess: All Routes Lead to Doom!」 (2020)
 【Piccoma】Hotto, Hitokoma (2020)
 Baby Star Ramen Otsumami (2020)
 Witch and the Beast (2020)
 Pocari Sweat (2021)
 Weekly Shounen Magazine「Tensei Shitara dai Nana Ouji dattanode, Kimamani Majutsu o Kiwamemasu」 (2021)
 Disney Christmas Movie「the WONDERFUL PRESENT!」 (2021)
 Baby Star Lullaby (2022)
 Choi Hapi Seven Sweets (2022), Aya
 Adachi Mitsuru no Shuutaisei「MIX」 (2022)
 Toyo Suisan「Urusei Yatsura x Maru-chan Red Fox and Green Tanuki」Collaboration Movie (2022), Miyake Shinobu

TV programs and internet shows

Narration

Films

Television drama

Web drama

Stage

Discography

Singles 

Digital singles

Albums

Mini albums

As a featured artist

Tie-up songs

Concerts

Personal concerts

Party and events

Other concerts

Personal concert video releases

Radio programs

Personal radio programs 

 Won't You Talk With Uchida Maaya? (内田真礼とおはなししません？) (2015–present)
M×M×S 内田真礼の「真礼充ラジオ」(2013–present)

Other radio programs 

 Sankarea Radio Hajimemashita (さんかれあラジオはじめました) (2012)
 Ayamaya!? (あやまあ屋!?) with Aya Suzaki (2013)
 Aoharadio (アオハラジオ) with Yuki Kaji (2014)
 Million Arthur Radio! MiriRaji! (ミリオンアーサーRADIO!ミリラジ) with Arisa Suzuki (2015–2020)
 I Reincarnated into an Otome Game as a Radio Personality With Only Destruction Flags...(女ゲームの破滅フラグしかないラジオパーソナリティーに転生してしまった...) (2020–2021)

Publications

Photobooks 

[2014.12.24] Maaya (まあや)
[2019.03.25] étoile 
[2023.02.08] Maaya Doki (まあやドキ)

Video 
 [2012.08.27] Akihabara Seiyuu Matsuri: THE MOVIE (秋葉原声優まつり THE MOVIE)
 [2013.02.22] Ura Ai Mai Mi (裏あいまいみー)
 [2013.04.17] Kane-Tomo Seiyuu Lab Vol. 1 (金朋声優ラボ Vol.1)
 [2013.10.21] Takamori Natsumi to Uchida Maaya no Seiyuu Shokugyou Taiken-sho (高森奈津美と内田真礼の声優職業体験所)
 [2013.12.24] Riddle Heart I ~Pension Stone Mountain Satsujin Shiken~ (リドルハートI〜ペンション・ストーンマウンテン殺人事件〜)
 [2014.12.24] Maaya, Okinawa ni Ittekimashita! (まあや、沖縄に行ってきましたっ!)
[2017.09.24] Uchida Maaya to Ohanashi Shimasen? ～ in Taiwan (内田真礼とおはなししません？～in 台湾)
[2019.03.25] Maaya, France ni Ittekimashita!! (まあや、フランスに行ってきましたっ!!)
[2022.03.01] Uchida Maaya to Kyanpu Shimasen? (内田真礼とキャンプしません？)

References

External links 
  
 Official agency profile 
 
 Maaya Uchida at Oricon 

1989 births
Living people
Anime singers
I'm Enterprise voice actors
Japanese stage actresses
Japanese television actresses
Japanese video game actresses
Japanese voice actresses
Japanese women pop singers
Pony Canyon artists
Singers from Tokyo
Voice actresses from Tokyo
21st-century Japanese actresses
21st-century Japanese women singers
21st-century Japanese singers